AK Partizan or Atletski Klub Partizan is an athletics club from Belgrade, Serbia. The club is part of the sports society JSD Partizan.

History
The club was founded in 1945, being among the first five clubs of JSD Partizan.

Honours

Men
National championships :
Winners (25) : 1947, 1948, 1949, 1950, 1951, 1952, 1956, 1957, 1958, 1959, 1960, 1961, 1962, 1963, 1964, 1966, 1984, 1991, 1996, 1997, 1998, 1999, 2000, 2001, 2012
National Cups :
Winners (8) : 1965, 1991, 1996, 1997, 1998, 1999, 2000, 2001

Women 
National championships :
Winners (11) : 1974, 1975, 1978, 1979, 1980, 1991, 1996, 1997, 1998, 1999, 2001
National Cups :
Winners (16) : 1974, 1975, 1976, 1977, 1978, 1979, 1980, 1981, 1990, 1991, 1995, 1996, 1997, 1998, 1999, 2001

Notable athletes

Field athletes
Ivan Gubijan - hammer thrower, won silver at the Olympics in 1948.
Dragutin Topić Olympian, world junior co-record holder 2.37m, WJCH champion in 1990, European champion 1990.
Dragan Perić Serbian shot put record holder with 21.77m.
Sead Krdžalić
Radoman Šćekić
Stevan Zorić
Ivan Ivančić
Danijela Čurović
Daria Filipović - Živanović
Tatjana Jelača Olympian, Serbian record holder with 62.68m.European youth and junior champion in 2007 and 2009, world junior bronze medalist in 2010, Mediterranean games silver medalist in 2013.
Asmir Kolašinac Olympian, European bronze medalist and European indoor champion in shot put

Track athletes
Franjo Mihalić - won silver at the Olympics in 1956 in marathon
Dragoslav Prpa
Jelena Jotanović Serbian 100mH record holder with 13.19 +1,5 m/s.
Petar Šegedin - European vice-champion in 3000m steeple chase
Goran Raičević long-distance runner, killed in Kosovo in 1999
Darko Radomirović Olympian; 1500-meter specialist, represented FR Yugoslavia at 2000 Summer Olympics
Emir Bekrić - Olympian, World bronze medalist in 400mH, Serbian 400mH record holder with 48.05, European vice-champion in 400mH.
Slobodan Branković - Serbian 400m, 4x400m record holder (45.30, 2:59.95), European indoor champion in 400m.
Andrija Ottenheimer
Josip Međimurec
Goran Nava
Miloš Raović
Mladen Nikolić
Đani Kovač
Mileta Božović

References

Additional Source for Notability of Existence

External links 
Fansite

Athletics clubs in Serbia
Sport in Belgrade
Sports clubs established in 1945
1945 establishments in Serbia